Empress Huyan (呼延皇后, personal name unknown) (died  312), formally Empress Wuyuan (武元皇后, literally "the martial and discerning empress") was an empress of the Xiongnu-led Han Zhao dynasty of China. She was the first wife of  Liu Cong (Emperor Zhaowu).

Life
Her clan, the Huyans, were probably a noble clan of Xiongnu, as a large number of Han Zhao officials were named Huyan.  She was created empress in 310 after Liu Cong seized the throne from his brother Liu He (after Liu He had tried to have him and the other brothers killed and successfully killed two).  She was the cousin of the first empress of Liu Cong's father Liu Yuan.  She bore Liu Cong at least one son -- Liu Can, whom Liu Cong created the Prince of He'nei and commissioned as a major general.  However, he did not create Liu Can crown prince because he had promised to make Liu Ai (劉乂), son of Liu Yuan's second wife Empress Dan, who had yielded the throne to him after Liu He's death, crown prince.  (He also had an affair with Liu Ai's mother Empress Dan, and this affair was part of the reason.)

When Empress Dowager Dan died in 310, Empress Huyan began to try to secure the crown prince position for her son, telling him:
"You inherited the throne from your father.  What does the Crown Prince have to do with it?  After you die, Liu Can and his brothers will not even get to live."  
Liu Cong did not follow her suggestion at this point, but the seeds were sown, and eventually in 317, long after her death, he would depose Crown Prince Ai and make Liu Can crown prince.

Empress Huyan died in 312 and was given a posthumous name, appropriate for an empress.

References 

|- style="text-align: center;"

|-

|-

312 deaths
Former Zhao empresses
Year of birth unknown
3rd-century births
4th-century Chinese women
4th-century Chinese people